Port Hueneme (Chumash: Wene Me) is a small beach city in Ventura County, California, surrounded by the city of Oxnard and the Santa Barbara Channel. Both the Port of Hueneme and Naval Base Ventura County lie within the city limits.

Port Hueneme has a south-facing sand beach, known for its surfing. The beach has a wooden fishing pier and is about a mile long between Ormond Beach downcoast and Point Hueneme Light at the harbor entrance shared by the naval base and the port. The Waterfront Promenade, also known as the Lighthouse Promenade, provides a paved public access along the shoreline with two historic sites at viewpoints: the 1872 Wharf and the Oxnard Packing House.

Name
The name Hueneme derives from the Spanish spelling of the Ventureño Chumash name Wene Me, meaning "Resting Place". In the 1800s, the postmaster named the post office Wynema after his company, Wynema Lighter Co. The town's name was officially changed to Port Hueneme in 1939 and was incorporated March 24, 1948.

In July 2021, the city council approved starting the process to change the city name to Hueneme Beach During the adoption of the strategic plan in October 2020, staff recommended rebranding the city as a way to attract tourism, bring new businesses, and draw attention to the city's coastline. The initiative was voted down in November 2022.

History 

Juan Rodríguez Cabrillo explored this area and the adjacent Channel Islands in October 1542.

Thomas Bard learned of the submarine canyon at Point Hueneme and took advantage of the canyon depth to construct the Hueneme Wharf in 1871 here. The existing street grid of the town was formally laid out in 1888. Until the construction of the Montalvo Cutoff that brought the railroad to nearby Oxnard, the wharf was the principal means of transportation for that portion of Ventura County lying south of the Santa Clara River. Hueneme was the second largest grain shipping port on the Pacific coast between 1871 and 1895.

A  pier was built in 1956 as a construction trestle for a sewer outfall pipeline. The fishing pier is now  after having been modified over the years.

On January 31, 2000, Alaska Airlines Flight 261 crashed into the Pacific Ocean between Port Hueneme and Anacapa Island after a mechanical failure. U.S. Navy Base Ventura County, adjacent to the port, was the staging ground for recovery of the wreckage. The victims' families later approved the construction of a memorial sundial designed by Santa Barbara artist James "Bud" Bottoms, which was placed on the beach close to the crash site. Victims' names are placed on bronze plates mounted on the dial's perimeter. The sundial casts a shadow on a memorial plaque at 16:22 each January 31.

Geography

Port Hueneme is located on the southwest portion of the Oxnard Plain on the Pacific Ocean.

According to the United States Census Bureau, the city has a total area of 4.7 square miles (12.1 km2). 4.5 square miles (11.5 km2) of it is land and 0.2 square miles (0.6 km2) of it (4.70%) is water.

Climate
This region experiences warm (but not hot) and dry summers, with no average monthly temperatures above 71.6 °F. According to the Köppen Climate Classification system, Port Hueneme has a warm-summer Mediterranean climate, abbreviated "Csb" on climate maps.

Demographics

2010

The 2010 United States Census reported that Port Hueneme had a population of 21,723. The racial makeup of Port Hueneme was 12,357 (56.9%) White, 1,111 (5.1%) African American, 295 (1.4%) Native American, 1,299 (6.0%) Asian, 119 (0.5%) Pacific Islander, 5,224 (24.0%) from other races, and 1,318 (6.1%) from two or more races. Hispanic or Latino of any race were 11,360 people (52.3%).

The Census reported that 20,854 people (96.0% of the population) lived in households, 869 (4.0%) lived in non-institutionalized group quarters, and 0 (0%) were institutionalized.

There were 7,080 households, out of which 2,832 (40.0%) had children under the age of 18 living in them, 3,267 (46.1%) were opposite-sex married couples living together, 1,121 (15.8%) had a female householder with no husband present, 440 (6.2%) had a male householder with no wife present. There were 458 (6.5%) unmarried opposite-sex partnerships, and 53 (0.7%) same-sex married couples or partnerships. 1,760 households (24.9%) were made up of individuals, and 775 (10.9%) had someone living alone who was 65 years of age or older. The average household size was 2.95. There were 4,828 families (68.2% of all households); the average family size was 3.52.

The population was spread out, with 5,781 people (26.6%) under the age of 18, 2,705 people (12.5%) aged 18 to 24, 6,258 people (28.8%) aged 25 to 44, 4,593 people (21.1%) aged 45 to 64, and 2,386 people (11.0%) who were 65 years of age or older. The median age was 31.3 years. For every 100 females, there were 103.2 males. For every 100 females age 18 and over, there were 101.1 males.

The homeowner vacancy rate was 2.7%; the rental vacancy rate was 6.0%. 9,747 people (44.9% of the population) lived in owner-occupied housing units and 11,107 people (51.1%) lived in rental housing units.

2000

As of the census of 2000, there were 21,845 people, 7,268 households, and 5,000 families residing in the city. The population density was 4,912.9 inhabitants per square mile (1,895.4/km2). The racial makeup of the city was 57.27% White, 6.06% African American, 1.69% Native American, 6.33% Asian, 0.50% Pacific Islander, 21.84% from other races, and 6.30% from two or more races. Hispanic or Latino of any race were 41.02% of the population.

There were 7,268 households, out of which 37.4% had children under the age of 18 living with them, 49.9% were married couples living together, 13.5% had a female householder with no husband present, and 31.2% were non-families. Twenty-four point one percent of all households were made up of individuals, and 10.3% had someone living alone who was 65 years of age or older. The average household size was 2.86 and the average family size was 3.42.

In the city, the population was spread out, with 27.6% under the age of 18, 13.2% from 18 to 24, 32.0% from 25 to 44, 16.5% from 45 to 64, and 10.7% who were 65 years of age or older. The median age was 30 years. For every 100 females, there were 101.2 males. For every 100 females age 18 and over, there were 100.7 males.

The median income for a household in the city was $42,246, and the median income for a family was $46,056. Males had a median income of $30,314 versus $25,703 for females. The per capita income for the city was $17,311. About 9.8% of families and 12.2% of the population were below the poverty line, including 16.7% of those under age 18 and 8.9% of those age 65 or over.

Economy

The business district is on Channel Islands Boulevard on the north side of the city separated from the original downtown by the Naval base.

Cannabis

Under the legalization of the sale and distribution of cannabis in California, the city developed a model program as the only city in Ventura county to initially allow multiple types of marijuana businesses, including cultivation, manufacturing and retail sales. Commercial activities, such as growing, testing, and selling cannabis within their jurisdiction may be regulated by each city by licensing none or only some of these activities but local governments may not prohibit adults from growing, using, or transporting marijuana for personal use.

By the end of 2018, the city had four recreational marijuana storefronts. As one of the few cities with retail, the city found that about 10 percent of the customers are from Port Hueneme with approximately 50 percent from the adjacent city of Oxnard. About 15 percent were from Camarillo and 10 percent from Ventura with the remaining 15 percent of customers coming from other areas. During a city sponsored workshop in 2019, the chief of the state Bureau of Cannabis Control, which regulates the industry said, “I think you have a lot to be proud of this city. This city has shown if it's done right, it really works well.” In 2022, the city council approved allowing cannabis events with sale and consumption at the Hueneme Beach Park parking lots after a small cannabis farmers market in December 2021 generated about $4,000 in city revenue. Only one event of the series of six events occurred after the first event had poor attendance and sales, prompting the event organizers to cancel the remaining 5 approved events. The city was the first in the county to allow cannabis lounges in 2022.

Five percent of gross revenues from these businesses is collected by the city per agreements that allow them to operate in the city. This has helped with a deficit city budget. The city was able to produce a balanced budget without dipping into reserves in 2019 for the first time in many years partially due to the cannabis revenue. In the fiscal year 2020, the city collected $2.2 million. Businesses are required to contribute one percent to community activities. The retail shops are required to have armed security on the premises during hours of operation with some businesses deciding to have a guard nearby 24 hours a day. Security video feed from the shops must be accessible to the police at all times.

The Port 
 
The Port of Hueneme, shared with Oxnard Harbor District and Naval Base Ventura County, is the only deep water port between the Los Angeles and the San Francisco, and the only Navy-controlled harbor between San Diego Bay and Puget Sound, Washington.

The harbor is a shipping and receiving point for a wide variety of goods destined for the Los Angeles Basin and beyond, including automobiles, pineapples, and bananas. Agricultural products such as onions, strawberries, and flowers are shipped. The city receives about $2 million in tax revenue annually from the port.

In 2014, the beach at Port Hueneme had been eroding for the 60 years since it was built as a commercial port, with jetties that block the natural flow of sand. After the US Navy took over the port during World War II, the government had the responsibility to put back the sand that had disappeared. Funds were lacking until 2013 when it was announced that nearly $12 million in funding would be available to replenish the sand at the beach, the money coming from various branches of the government. Furthermore, there is a continuing, expensive routine to prevent ocean water from sitting on the city streets.

Arts and culture

Hueneme Beach Festival

Since 1998, the city of Port Hueneme holds an annual theme-based beach festival at 550 East Surfside Drive. This 2-day event is held in mid/late August. Entertainment includes live music, rides, games, attractions, food/ vendor booths and exhibits.

Hueneme Harbor Days (Historic)

Prior to the "Hueneme Beach Festival", the HHD Board of Directors ran the 'Port Hueneme Harbor Days Festival & Parade' with food, bands, entertainment, kids attractions, vendor booths, and activities, such as kite-flying contests, sand sculpture contests, metal detection contests, and a long time ago, bathing suit contests. HHB was started in 1950 and ended in 2001, after 51 years of successful operations. The demise came from a lack of city support, and financial troubles such as an increases in fees for insurance, and food handling regulations. There are pictures of the early Hueneme Harbor Days Festival at the local history museum.

Banana Festival
The Banana Festival is an annual event with tours of the port, food, and entertainment. Since 2011, the Port of Hueneme holds the event on the port grounds. The festival includes port tours, live bands, a kids zone, local vendors, and food/drink. Attendees spend the day celebrating the over 3.3 billion bananas that come through the Port of Hueneme each year and have the chance to receive free bananas/banana products from the companies working to transport bananas through the port such as Del Monte and Chiquita.

Sports

This South facing beach offers pitching waves year-round from a multitude of swell directions. As a result of great surf, Port Hueneme surfers are territorial and localism has been known to be a problem.

Education
Most of the city of Port Hueneme lies within the boundaries of the Hueneme School District. Portions of the city north of Channel Islands are served by Oxnard Elementary School District. Elementary schools within Port Hueneme include: Hueneme Elementary, Richard Bard Elementary, Parkview Elementary, and Sunkist Elementary.

Hueneme High School of the Oxnard Union High School District serves most of the city. Portions of the city north of Channel Islands are served by Oxnard High School.

Libraries

Ventura County Library serves the community through its local branch, the Ray D. Prueter Library.

See also

List of ports in the United States
Alaska Airlines 261

References

External links

City of Port Hueneme official website

 
Cities in Ventura County, California
Incorporated cities and towns in California
Populated coastal places in California
Port cities in California
Geography of Oxnard, California